The 1978 European Wrestling Championshipswere held in the men's Freestyle style in Sofia Bulgaria  5 – 7 May 1979; the Greco-Romane style in Oslo Norway 8 – 11 April 1981.

Medal table

Medal summary

Men's freestyle

Men's Greco-Roman

References

External links
Fila's official championship website

Europe
W
European Wrestling Championships
Euro
Sports competitions in Sofia
1978 in European sport
W
Euro
Sports competitions in Oslo